Danielle Guéneau (married name Ménard; born 21 August 1947 in Pornic) is a former French athlete, who specialised in the sprints and hurdles.

Biography  
She won three  championship titles of France: 80 Metres Hurdles in 1966 and 1967, and the 100m 1964.

She set six times the French record for the 4 × 100 Metres Relay in 1964, 1966 and 1967.

She participated in the 1964 Olympic Games at Tokyo. She was a quarter-finalist in the 100m and took  eighth in the 4 × 100 m relay.

Prize list  
 French Championships in Athletics:  
 winner of the 80m hurdles in 1966 and 1967.   
 winner of 100 m 1964

Records

notes and references

External links  
 Olympic profile for Danielle Guéneau on sports-reference.com

Living people
1947 births
Athletes (track and field) at the 1964 Summer Olympics
French female sprinters
Olympic athletes of France
French female hurdlers
20th-century French women